Sam Barry (born 27 January 1992) is an Irish professional tennis player. He was born and raised in Limerick, Ireland.

Career

Juniors
In 2008, Barry won the under-18 boy's title at the National Junior Tennis Championships and the ITF U-18 boys' singles title in Tallinn, Estonia. This was his first ITF under-18 title following defeats in the finals of similar events in Qatar and Turkmenistan the previous year. Barry had a strong finish to 2008, winning both the Semen Gresik Widjojo Soejono Junior Championships in Surabaya and the Solo Open International Junior Championships in Java in November. The following year, Barry was successful at the Torneig ITF Andorra La Vella, defeating Andrés Artuñedo in the final. Throughout 2010, he competed in the Boys Singles at the Australian Open, French Open and US Open. His 2nd round defeat to Damir Džumhur at the U.S. Open was to be his last match in the under-18 category. As a junior player, Barry reached a career-high ranking of 60th in the world U-18 boys' singles.

Professional
He turned professional in October 2010 and immediately reached the quarter-final of his first tournament, the F29 Futures in Naples. Barry continued to show promise in 2010 with notable wins over Jiri Kosler in the Thalassa Cup, and followed this up in 2011 with the strongest performance on his senior career in the Thailand F2 Futures, reaching the semi-finals and defeating Joshua Milton along the way.

Barry initially chose to focus on doubles. He has won 9 doubles tournaments on the Futures circuit and finished runner-up in 14 others, as well as reaching the final of the 2011 Aegon Pro-Series Loughborough tournament on the ATP Challenger Tour in November 2011 with Daniel Glancy, losing to the top 100 ranked British duo of Jamie Delgado and Jonathan Marray. Barry usually partners compatriots Glancy, James Cluskey and Colin O'Brien in tournaments.

From 2012 onwards, Barry's energies were more focussed on the singles game, and he reached the singles main draw of a challenger for the first time in September 2013 at the ATP Roller Open, where he lost in the first round to former top-20 player Paul-Henri Mathieu. He completed the year with victory in his first Futures final in December, defeating Liam Broady to claim the Qatar F3 Futures title in Doha.

In March 2014, Barry reached the final of the Great Britain F8 Futures, however he finished runner-up to Marcus Willis. This propelled him to a career-high ranking of 392 on 23 March 2014. He followed this up on 11 May with victory over Adrien Bossel at the Israel F5 Futures in Ashkelon, reaching the final without dropping a set. Barry then went on an impressive run in doubles, winning three consecutive tournaments. He then picked up his second futures title of the year, winning another Israeli futures event, this time in Herzliya.

His subsequent rise up the rankings enabled him to gain direct acceptance to challenger level tournaments and he competed at the OEC Kaohsiung but was defeated in his first round match.

Barry reached his highest ranking of 280th in the world and became Irish no.1 on 15 May 2015 after reaching the final of the Bangkok Challenger.

Davis Cup
Barry has played ten rubbers for the Ireland Davis Cup team, winning five and losing five. He pulled off an impressive win over 2010 Wimbledon junior champion Márton Fucsovics in a tie against Hungary in February 2012. This win did come in a dead rubber, however, with Ireland 3–1 down at the time.

Singles titles

Wins (6)

Runner-up (6)

Doubles titles

Wins (14)

Runner-up (15)

References

External links
 
 
 

1992 births
Living people
Irish male tennis players
Sportspeople from Limerick (city)